The Éditions du Centurion are a French publishing house established in Paris, 3, rue Bayard, in 1945 by the Assumptionists fathers of the "Maison de la Bonne Presse" which became Bayard Presse in 1969.

It then became an autonomous department of the Bayard-Presse group. the Editions du Centurion publish the daily newspaper La Croix, the weekly Le Pèlerin, the monthlies Notre Temps, Panorama, .

In the 1990s, the catalog was gradually absorbed under the Bayard brand.

At the end of 2013, the brand Le Centurion was revived to develop a new catalog of books for the youth and adult public.

External links 
 Le Centurion, Qui sommes-nous ?
 Latest publications
 Official website
 Le Centurion on Ricochet-Jeunes

Children's book publishers
Editions du Centurion
1945 establishments in France
Publishing companies established in 1945
Magazine publishing companies of France
Mass media in Paris
Newspaper companies of France